d'Agincourt is a surname. Notable people with the surname include:

François d'Agincourt (1684–1758), French harpsichordist, organist, and composer
Jean Baptiste Seroux d'Agincourt (1730–1814),  French archaeologist and historian

French-language surnames